() is a Japanese company. It is listed on the Nikkei 225. Mitsui E&S is one of the companies of the Mitsui Group.

History 
Mitsui E&S was established in 1917 as the Shipbuilding Division of Mitsui & Co. with the first shipyard at Tamano. In 1926 it began manufacturing diesel engines under a license agreement with Burmeister & Wain of Denmark.

In 1937 the shipyards became a separate entity of Mitsui, Tama Shipyard. The company changed to Mitsui Shipbuilding & Engineering Co., Ltd in 1942 and finally to the current name in 1973.

Mitsui E&S acquired Burmeister & Wain's engineering and construction business in 1990, and through this company acquired Burmeister's boiler business in 2017, which primarily caters to small and medium biomass power plants.

Mitsui E&S split its naval and merchant shipbuilding businesses in 2021, selling the former (including the Tamano Shipyard) to Mitsubishi Heavy Industries and selling a 49% stake in the latter to Tsuneishi Shipbuilding. Tsuneishi took over a majority stake of the merchant shipbuilding business in 2022 as Mitsui E&S refocused its strategy on marine engines, port cranes, and other machinery.

In 2022, Mitsui E&S agreed to purchase IHI's marine engine business, and announced that it was in the process of developing ammonia-fueled marine engine technologies as a means of reducing CO2 emissions.

Facilities
Mitsui E&S has works in Tamano, Ichikawa, and Oita, and business offices in Tokyo, Nagoya, Osaka, Oita, Hanoi, Jakarta, London, and Shanghai.

Notable ships

Imperial Japanese Navy 

 Shimushu-class escorts Shimushu and Ishigaki
 Etorofu-class escorts Matsuwa, Iki, Wakamiya, and Manju
 Ukuru-class escorts Inagi, Habuchi, Oshika, Kanawa, and Takane
 Atami-class gunboat Atami
 Gunboat Kotaka
 Ōtori-class torpedo boat Kiji
 W-1-class minesweeper W-2
 W-5-class minesweeper W-5
 W-7-class minesweeper W-7
 W-13-class minesweeper W-16
 W-17-class minesweeper W-18
 No. 4-class submarine chaser Nos. 8 and 12
 No. 13-class submarine chaser Nos. 14 and 20
 No. 28-class submarine chaser Nos. 30, 33, and 37
 Hirashima-class auxiliary ships Hoko and Niizaki

Japan Maritime Self-Defense Force 
 2 Ōsumi class LST - 4001 and 4002
 1 Hiuchi class support ship - JS Hiuchi (AMS-4301)
 1 W-7 Class minesweeper (W-7)
 Abukuma class destroyer escorts

Ocean liners 

 Ukishima Maru
 Hōkoku Maru
 Aikoku Maru
 Gokoku Maru

Tankers 

 Berge Emperor

Bulkers 

 Mitsui 56 series: A popular type of bulk carrier. , Mitsui had built 151 of them.

References

External links

Company website 

Japanese companies established in 1917
Companies listed on the Tokyo Stock Exchange
Engineering companies of Japan
Shipbuilding companies of Japan
Defense companies of Japan
Manufacturing companies based in Tokyo
Mitsui
Manufacturing companies established in 1917
Japanese brands